Dharma Mittra is a guru of modern yoga and a student of Swami Kailashananda.

Mittra is known for his Master Yoga Chart of 908 Postures, each asana illustrated with a photograph of Mittra performing the pose. He has been teaching since 1967, and is director of the Dharma Yoga Center in New York City which he founded in 1975.

Life

Dharma Mittra was born on May 14, 1939, in Pirapora, Minas Gerais, Brazil. He started studying Yoga in 1958. In 1964, he left the Brazilian Air Force and moved to New York City, to study under his new guru, Swami Kailashananda, known in America as Yogi Gupta. After intensive study of Ashtanga and Karma Yoga, in 1966 he was accepted and initiated as a sannyasi (one who renounces the world in order to realize God). Dharma began teaching in 1967, after spending a decade as a full-time yogi and brahmachari (a celibate religious student who lives with his teacher and devotes himself to the practice of spiritual disciplines). A celebrated teacher at his guru's ashram, he left in 1975 and founded the Dharma Yoga Center in New York City. He is director of the Dharma Yoga Center in New York City.

Dharma Mittra completed the Master Yoga Chart of 908 Postures in 1984, after having photographed himself in 1300 Yoga postures, then cut and pasted the pictures to create the work; by 2003, it had sold over 50,000 copies. The Master Yoga Chart is hung in ashrams and Yoga centers worldwide, as a teaching tool and inspiration for all students of Yoga. His more recent book,  entitled Asanas: 608 Yoga Poses was published in 2003. In 2006, he released an instructional Yoga video series entitled Maha Sadhana: The Great Practice. Mittra is also featured as the inspiration and model for Yoga Journal'''s coffee table book, entitled Yoga''.

References

Brazilian yogis
American Hindus
Brazilian Hindus
Converts to Hinduism
People from Minas Gerais
Educators from New York City
American yoga teachers
1939 births
Living people
Brazilian emigrants to the United States
Modern yoga gurus